Warren Township is one of nine townships in Marion County, Indiana. As of the 2010 census, its population was 99,433. Warren Township was named for Joseph Warren.

Warren Central High School, Creston Middle School, and Raymond Park Middle School are located within the township.

Geography

Municipalities 
 Beech Grove (small portion)
 Cumberland (west half)
 Indianapolis (partial)
 Warren Park

Communities 
 Eastgate
 Irvington

References

External links

 Indiana Township Association page for Marion County
 United Township Association of Indiana

Townships in Marion County, Indiana
Geography of Indianapolis
Townships in Indiana